The APEV Scoutchel is a French amateur-built aircraft, designed by Daniel Dalby and  produced by APEV of Peynier. The aircraft is supplied as plans or as a kit for amateur construction.

Design and development
The Scoutchel is derived from the earlier APEV Demoichelle, itself an updated version of the pre-First World War Santos-Dumont Demoiselle.

The Scoutchel features a strut-braced high-wing, a single-seat open cockpit without a cockpit fairing, fixed tricycle landing gear and a single engine mounted above the cockpit on the keel tube, in tractor configuration.

The aircraft is made from bolted-together aluminum tubing. The wings are the same as those used on the Pouchel Light and are built around a single aluminium spar, with ribs made from extruded polystyrene with plywood bracing, all bonded to fibreglass leading and trailing edges, covered in Dacron sailcloth. A unique roll control system is used as the aircraft has no ailerons. Instead the wings are pivoted to +4° and -2° to produce and control roll. The wings can be folded for ground transportation or storage.

Recommended engines are the  Rotax 377 or the  Rotax 447 two-stroke powerplants, although it can also fit electric motors as well.

The manufacturer estimates building times at 150 hours from the kit and 300 hours from plans.

Specifications (Scoutchel)

References

External links
Official website

Homebuilt aircraft
Single-engined tractor aircraft
Scoutchel
Parasol-wing aircraft
French ultralight aircraft